Demonocracy is the third studio album by American death metal band Job for a Cowboy. It was released on April 10, 2012. It is the band's first studio album to feature guitarist Tony Sannicandro and bassist Nick Schendzielos, the second with former Despised Icon guitarist Al Glassman, and the last album to feature drummer Jon Rice.

Demonocracy had first week sales of 4,900 to chart at No. 87 on the Billboard 200.

Promotion 
On February 21, 2012, Job for a Cowboy released the first song from the album, "Nourishment Through Bloodshed." It was released via Metal Blade Records' YouTube channel.

On March 20, Job for a Cowboy premiered the song "Black Discharge" and, on April 2, the song "Imperium Wolves."

A music video was made for the song Tarnished Gluttony which featured a man carrying a small child (presumebly his son) to a forest before cutting his Guts open and then replacing it with a Squid and then placing his son into a river.

Track listing

Influences 
In a 2012 interview with Loudwire, vocalist Jonny Davy listed both Cattle Decapitation and Misery Index as influences upon the sound of the album.

Credits 

Production and performance credits are adapted from the album liner notes, except where noted.

Personnel 
Job for a Cowboy
 Jonny Davy – vocals
 Al Glassman – guitars
 Tony Sannicandro – guitars
 Nick Schendzielos – bass
 Jon Rice – drums

Production
 Jason Suecof – production, engineering, mixing
 Eyal Levi – engineering
 Ronn Miller – assistant engineering
 Alan Douches – mastering

Artwork and design
 Brent Elliott White – artwork
 Brian Ames – layout

Management
 Chuck Andrews – management
 Brian Slagel – A&R

Studios 
 Audiohammer Studios – recording
 West Westside – mastering
 You Get What You Get Studios – pre-production

Charts

References

External links 
 
 Demonocracy at Metal Blade Records

2012 albums
Job for a Cowboy albums
Metal Blade Records albums
Albums produced by Jason Suecof